Boy Child: The Best of 1967–1970 is a compilation album by the singer-songwriter Scott Walker. It was released in 1990. The album compiles music that Walker both wrote and recorded on five of his first six studio albums; Scott (1967), Scott 2 (1968), Scott 3 (1969), Scott 4 (1969) and 'Til the Band Comes In (1970). The original release also includes the non-Walker composition "The Rope and The Colt", a French single recorded by the singer for the 1969 film Une corde, un colt. Also included was the 1967 b-side "The Plague".

In 2000 the album was re-released under the altered title Boy Child: 67–70 on HDCD with modified track listing and running order. The new version dropped "The Rope and The Colt" and added the Scott 4 track "Angels of Ashes".

Track listing

Boy Child: The Best of 1967–1970 (1990) CD/Cassette

Boy Child: The Best of 1967 – 1970 (1990) LP

Boy Child: 67–70 (2000) HDCD

Personnel
 John Franz – Producer
 Wally Stott – Director of Accompaniment (All tracks except those indicated below)
 Wally Stott – Arrangements, Conductor ("Montague Terrace (In Blue)" and "Such A Small Love")
 Peter Knight – Director of Accompaniment ("The Plague", "The Seventh Seal", "The Old Man's Back Again" and "Angels of Ashes")
 Peter Knight – Arrangements, Conductor ("The Girls From the Streets")
 Reg Guest – Arrangements, Conductor ("The Amorous Humphrey Plugg")
 Andre Hassein – Director of Accompaniment ("The Rope and The Colt")
 Marc Almond – Liner notes (1990 edition)
 Neil Hannon – Liner notes (2000 edition)

References

Scott Walker (singer) albums
1990 compilation albums
2000 compilation albums
Albums produced by Johnny Franz